Clinton Edward Bowyer (born May 30, 1979) is an American semi-retired professional stock car racing driver and commentator for NASCAR on Fox.

He competed in the NASCAR Cup Series from 2005 to 2020, driving for Richard Childress Racing for eight years, Michael Waltrip Racing for four years, HScott Motorsports for one year, and Stewart-Haas Racing for four years. Bowyer won the 2008 Nationwide Series championship driving for RCR.

Following the 2020 season, Bowyer became an analyst for Fox Sports' NASCAR coverage. Bowyer currently competes part-time in the  SRX Series.

Early career
Bowyer began racing at the age of five in motocross. He went on to capture over 200 wins and numerous championships over the next eight years. In 1996, he began racing street stocks at Thunderhill Speedway in Mayetta, Kansas, and won the Modified championship there in 2000. Bowyer racked up 18 wins and 32 top-five finishes on his way to capturing the 2001 Modified championships at Lakeside Speedway in Kansas City, Kansas and Heartland Park Topeka. In 2002, he began racing in the NASCAR Weekly Racing Series, posting 9 poles, 12 wins and 32 top-five finishes en route to a second-place finish in the NASCAR Weekly Racing Series national point standings. He was also crowned the 2002 NASCAR Weekly Racing Series Midwest Champion after another Modified championship at Lakeside Speedway and a Late Model championship at the famed I-70 Speedway in Odessa, Missouri, his first attempt at racing on asphalt.

In 2003, Bowyer raced a full season in the NASCAR AutoZone Elite Division Midwest Series, scoring one top-ten finish in 11 starts. He also would make his first ARCA starts in 2003, and caught the eye of legendary car owner Richard Childress after leading 47 laps and finishing second in his debut at Nashville Superspeedway driving for Scott Traylor out of Kansas City.

After the second-place finish, Childress called Bowyer by phone and offered him a job. Bowyer thought he was joking and hung up on him. Childress called back soon afterward and with a not-too-happy tone he still offered the job to Bowyer.

NASCAR career

2004
In 2004, Bowyer began by finishing eighth in the ARCA Re/Max Series race at Daytona in the No. 7 Chevrolet for Scott Traylor. In 2004, Bowyer began running in the Busch Series for Childress, sharing seat time in the No. 21 Reese's -sponsored Chevrolet with Kevin Harvick. He drove in half of the 34 Busch Series races that year, winning one pole at Talladega and seven Top 10s, attaining a season-high third-place finish in the Federated Auto Parts 300 at Nashville Superspeedway in June. He also ran three races for Kevin Harvick Incorporated with help from Andy Petree Racing driving the No. 33 Chevrolet sponsored by Monaco Coaches and Snap-on. Bowyer made two starts for Bill McAnally Racing in the Camping World West Series in the No. 20 Chevrolet. In his two starts at Phoenix and Auto Club Speedway, he won one pole and had a best finish of second.

2005–06

Bowyer's first full Busch season was in 2005, replacing Ron Hornaday in the No. 2 ACDelco-sponsored Chevrolet. He won two poles and two races en route to a second-place finish to repeat-champion Martin Truex Jr., losing by only 68 points. He also made his Nextel Cup debut in the No. 33 Sylvania-sponsored Chevy on April 23, 2005, during the Subway Fresh 500 at Phoenix International Raceway. He finished 22nd as the first car one lap down. Richard Childress Racing announced on October 15, 2005, that Bowyer would race the No. 07 Jack Daniel's-sponsored Chevrolet full-time in the Nextel Cup series, replacing Dave Blaney for the 2006 season.

Bowyer began his rookie Cup season with three Top 5 finishes and had a total of eleven Top 10s that season, with his best finish being a third at California Speedway. He finished 68 points behind Denny Hamlin for NASCAR Rookie of the Year honors. Bowyer also continued to drive the No. 2 in the Busch Series full-time, winning once and finishing third in points. Bowyer won his first Craftsman Truck Series race in the No. 46 Chevrolet Silverado fielded by Morgan-Dollar Motorsports at Texas Motor Speedway on November 3, 2006, in his third career Truck start, making his first CTS start that year at Martinsville for Green Light Racing.

2007

After starting the 2007 season with a last-lap crash at Daytona (crossing the finish line upside down and on fire as teammate Kevin Harvick won), Bowyer won the Budweiser Pole position for the Dodge Avenger 500 at Darlington Raceway. He finished the regular season ninth in points, but was seeded 12th for the playoff since race wins determine playoff seeding. Bowyer won his second pole at the Sylvania 300 at Loudon, and two days later went on to win his first Nextel Cup race in his 64th start. The win made Bowyer the fifteenth driver to win at least one race in all three of NASCAR's top series.

For the 2007 Busch season, Bowyer ran a partial Busch Series schedule in the RCR No. 2 car. On April 20, 2007, he won the Busch Series Bashas' Supermarkets 200 at Phoenix International Raceway. He followed that up with another Busch Series win on May 4 in the Circuit City 250 at Richmond International Raceway. Bowyer also ran select races in the NASCAR Craftsman Truck Series for Kevin Harvick.

2008

In 2008, Bowyer continued to drive in the Cup and Nationwide Series full-time. Bowyer dominated the late stages of the Daytona 500 but was spun out by Juan Pablo Montoya with 17 laps remaining. On May 3, 2008, Bowyer earned his second Sprint Cup victory, winning the Crown Royal Presents the Dan Lowry 400 at Richmond International Speedway. Bowyer led only two laps, going to the front after Dale Earnhardt Jr. and Kyle Busch got together with less than four laps remaining in the race.

On August 23, 2008, Bowyer was announced as the driver of the No. 33 Chevrolet Impala SS for RCR.  Casey Mears from Hendrick Motorsports replaced Bowyer in the Jack Daniel's-sponsored car.  This move was necessitated by a sponsor's request, as General Mills did not want Mears, who had been driving in the 2008 season for rival cereal maker Kellogg's, representing them, so Childress sponsors General Mills and Brown-Forman Corporation (parent company to Jack Daniel's) agreed to the swap so Bowyer, who drove for Brown-Forman, would drive for General Mills, and Mears could drive for Brown-Forman, as they had no problems with Mears representing the company.

On November 15, 2008, Bowyer won the NASCAR Nationwide Series Championship at Homestead-Miami Speedway with a narrow margin of victory over Carl Edwards of 21 points. Edwards won the race with Bowyer finishing 5th.

2009: #33 Car
Bowyer concentrated primarily on the Sprint Cup Series in 2009 and drove the No. 33 Chevrolet Impala to 15th place in the season standings. Bowyer trimmed his participation in the Nationwide series to 12 races but performed well, winning at Daytona (July 3) and Dover (September 26), finishing in the Top 5 in six of the 12 races and notching eight Top 10s.

Bowyer started the Cup season in strong fashion, finishing fourth in the Daytona 500 and second at Las Vegas in the third race of the year. With a sixth in Atlanta and a fifth in Martinsville, Bowyer was second in the overall standings after six races.

A tough stretch in races 7 through 12 dropped Bowyer down to 17th overall, 109 points behind Mark Martin in 12th place.  After a much more consistent run in races 13- 23 (3rd at Pocono in the No. 33 Hartford Racing paint out, 8th at Sonoma, 8th at Michigan), Bowyer had climbed up to 14th overall, within 58 points of 12th place.  Finishing in the Top 15 in 8 of 11 races helped him make up 51 points on the 12th-place position.

A 21st finish the following week (race 24) at Bristol really hurt Bowyer's chance at the Chase, dropping him 112 points behind Matt Kenseth in 12th with just two races prior to the Chase. It was the 25th race (Pep Boys 500 at Atlanta) that sealed Bowyer's fate, as a spin on lap 309 cost him two laps and the chance to compete in the Chase.

While his chances at the Chase were over, Bowyer finished the season as he started it, with five Top 10s and nine Top 15s in the last 11 races. His top finish was the sixth-place run at Charlotte in the Scary Fast Count Chocula paint out. Overall, Bowyer finished the 2009 Sprint Cup Series in 15th place.

2010

True to form, Bowyer, performed well early in 2010, finishing fourth in Daytona, seventh at Martinsville, and ninth at Phoenix to stand sixth after seven races.  However, at Texas in the Samsung Mobile 500 (race 8), Bowyer got caught in a major crash on lap 317 that wiped out eighth other drivers and caused a 19-minute red flag race stoppage. The resulting 36th-place finish dropped Bowyer to 14th position overall, only one point behind 12th place Joey Logano. Seventh- and 12th-place finishes at Talladega and Richmond put Bowyer back into 12th place after 10 races.

The 11th race run at Darlington promised to be special. Bowyer ran the new The Hartford Racing paint out as part of The Hartford's 200th anniversary celebration. As part of Fox's coverage, Bowyer was one of four cars with an in-car camera for the race. However, 101 laps into the race, Bowyer went to the pits and ultimately the garage, with brake issues. After a second long stop to correct, Bowyer finished in 32nd position, 36 laps down.

Bowyer ran well again in races 12 through 14, like 17th, seventh, and ninth-place finishes allowed him to move back up into 12th-place overall. In race 13 (Coca-Cola 600 at Charlotte), Bowyer led lap 217 following a caution for debris. Kurt Busch passed Bowyer on the following lap and went on to win the race.

In races 15–17, Bowyer finished 22nd at Michigan, 31st at Sonoma, and seventh at Loudon, NH. Despite the poor finish, Bowyer was very competitive at Sonoma. He led lap 80 (of 110) and was in seventh place with 11 laps to go. But on lap 100, Elliott Sadler got bumped by Jeff Gordon and spun Bowyer, dropping him all the way back to 34th place.

Bowyer had one of his strongest runs of the year in the Coke Zero 400 at Daytona, leading 17 of the final 21 laps.  Unfortunately on the final Green-White restart, Bowyer got split by Jeff Gordon, lost the lead, fell back in the pack and ultimately spun.  In finishing 17th, Bowyer fell 49 points behind 12th place Carl Edwards.

In race 19 at Chicagoland, Bowyer ran well all night, finishing 4th and moving up into 12th place in the overall standings. He started 15th but moved up quickly, running in the Top 10 for the first half and then in the Top 5 for most of the latter half of the race, battling Jeff Gordon for the lead with less than 40 laps to go.

In the Sylvania 300 at New Hampshire Motor Speedway, Bowyer started second and led the most laps before fading back into the Top 5. Taking the white flag in the second position, he suddenly witnessed then-leader Tony Stewart run out of fuel, giving Bowyer the third win of his Sprint Cup career and vaulting him to second in the Chase standings behind Denny Hamlin. However, this was negated during post-race inspection at NASCAR's R&D center. Reports surfaced that Bowyer's car used at Richmond had come close to failing inspection. NASCAR announced on September 22 that they had issued fines and penalties to the No. 33 team after failing a secondary inspection. Most critically, crew chief Shane Wilson was suspended for the next 6 races and both Bowyer and car owner Richard Childress face $150,000 in fines and the loss of 150 championship points. The penalty dropped Bowyer back to 12th in points, 185 points behind Denny Hamlin. Childress appealed the decision, which reduced the suspensions to four races and $100,000, but the 150-point deduction was upheld.

During the Pepsi Max 400 weekend at Fontana, Bowyer and fellow Childress driver Austin Dillon taped an episode of The Price Is Right that was scheduled to feature NASCAR-themed Showcases (a practice that occurs during a Fontana race; host Drew Carey was the Grand Marshal of the August 2008 race) and aired on November 15. Bowyer finished 2nd to Tony Stewart in the race.

Bowyer barely edged teammate Kevin Harvick for the victory in the fall Talladega race, the AMP Energy Juice 500. The race ended with the leaders in Turn 1 when a caution was displayed for a large wreck on the front straightaway on the final lap.

Bowyer finished 10th in the final Chase standings, earning him a spot on stage at the season-ending Awards Banquet.

2011: Final Season At RCR

Bowyer started off the 2011 season strong in the Budweiser shootout practice sessions, and he and his teammates regularly sat on top of the pylon. In the race, he and Jeff Burton led many laps but faded to 10th at the end (9th due to Denny Hamlin being penalized for going below the yellow line).

Bowyer qualified 5th for the Daytona 500 and finished 2nd to teammate Jeff Burton in the second Gatorade duel by 0.005 seconds. They together dominated that race. In the Daytona 500, Bowyer teamed up with many drivers throughout the day including Jeff Burton; Paul Menard (his new RCR teammate); Dale Earnhardt Jr.; and Kyle Busch. After Burton's engine let go, Bowyer found himself getting a push from Kyle Busch. With four laps to go, Kurt Busch got into the back of Regan Smith which turned him up in front of Bowyer. Ryan Newman was also involved. Bowyer was able to salvage a 17th-place finish out of it, mainly because of the big pileups earlier in the race. He had led 31 laps.

The next race at Phoenix, Bowyer was taken out early in a multi-car crash on the backstretch. The Helping Hands (his pit crew) were able to repair the car fairly quickly and he was able to finish 27th.

In the 2011 Aaron's 499 at Talladega, Bowyer led the most laps with 38 and was being pushed by Kevin Harvick on the last lap, dueling with Hendrick drivers Jeff Gordon and Mark Martin. Approaching the tri-oval, Jimmie Johnson and Dale Earnhardt Jr. squeezed to the far inside, and Johnson beat Bowyer to the line by 0.002 seconds (less than a foot) in a four-wide finish, tied with the finish of Ricky Craven over Kurt Busch in the 2003 Carolina Dodge Dealers 400 for closest finish in Sprint Cup history.

At Dover, in the Nationwide series, Bowyer was involved in a major crash on the last lap, with Bowyer going on his side. He, and no one else were injured.

At New Hampshire, Bowyer led 49 of the last 51 laps and seemed to be on the road to victory; but with two laps to go, in a bizarre twist of fate, Tony Stewart passed him to win in a role reversal from the 2010 race.

On October 7, Bowyer signed a 3-year contract to race the No. 15 Toyota for Michael Waltrip Racing, starting in 2012.

Bowyer did not make the Chase, but he won the Chase race at Talladega for the 2nd consecutive year, pulling a slingshot on Burton out of turn 4 on the final lap of the race. The margin of victory was 0.018 seconds. It was his last win with Richard Childress Racing.

2012: First Season At MWR

The 2012 season marked a new beginning for Bowyer as he moved from Richard Childress Racing to Michael Waltrip Racing, signing a 3-year deal. Improvements at Michael Waltrip Racing with the addition of former RCR director of competition Scott Miller and veteran driver Mark Martin as a teammate translated into Bowyer's best season statistically in the Sprint Cup Series.

Bowyer's 2012 season began sour, as his Daytona 500 qualifying time was disallowed, and he also ran out of fuel under green when he missed pit road during the 500. In March, he ended up starting a year-long rivalry with Jeff Gordon at the Martinsville race. Gordon's team, Hendrick Motorsports, was going for their 200th victory at the team's statistically best track. On a late green-white-checkered restart with 2 laps to go, Gordon was running first with Hendrick teammate Jimmie Johnson in second and Bowyer third. Bowyer dove to the low side and made it three wide going into turn one, sending all three spinning around and giving the win to Ryan Newman. Bowyer apologized for the contact but later incidents at other 2012 races led to a heated rivalry.

In June, at the Toyota/Save Mart 350at Sonoma, California, Bowyer dominated the race, scoring his first road course victory as well as his first MWR win by holding off Tony Stewart and Kurt Busch. At the AdvoCare 500 at Atlanta, Bowyer suffered battery issues but still managed to clinch a Chase berth with a 27th-place finish. He rebounded the following week at the Federated Auto Parts 400 at Richmond, winning the race using fuel strategy despite being spun by Juan Pablo Montoya mid-race.

Bowyer's two wins positioned him sixth at the start of the Chase for the Sprint Cup. In the Chase, he won at Charlotte after Brad Keselowski made a late-race pit stop.

Coming to the white flag at the AdvoCare 500 (Phoenix) on November 11, 2012, Bowyer's rivalry with Jeff Gordon came to a head. Earlier in the race, Bowyer accidentally put Gordon into the wall. Gordon was then black-flagged for a failed attempt to cut Bowyer's tire. On the next-to-last lap, Gordon decided enough was enough and responded by intentionally wrecking Bowyer in turn three, collecting Joey Logano and Aric Almirola. After Gordon's car was parked behind his team's hauler, a member of Bowyer's team shoved Gordon from behind and both teams scuffled. After Bowyer entered the pit area with his damaged car and noticed his team was not in his pit stall, he sprinted towards Gordon's hauler attempting to enter it before being restrained by a single NASCAR official. The incident knocked Bowyer down to fourth place in the points standings and mathematically ended Bowyer's chance of winning the Championship. Bowyer was not penalized for his involvement in the fight, but his crew chief Brian Pattie was fined $35,000 after he expressed his displeasure with Gordon by using profanity on national television, forcing ESPN  to apologize to viewers.

The following week, Bowyer rebounded, and finished second at Homestead (ironically behind Gordon) and completed the season with a career best second-place finish in the final points, passing Jimmie Johnson by one point, who was eliminated with a drive train malfunction. In victory lane at the race, Jeff Gordon apologized for his behavior at Phoenix and moved on from the incident.

2013
Bowyer started out 2013 by participating in the Rolex 24 Hours of Daytona, driving a Ferrari 458 with AF Corse/Michael Waltrip Racing. The team finished 16th overall and 7th in class.

At Richmond International Raceway on September 7, Bowyer became the subject of controversy as, late in the race, his No. 15 Toyota spun; accusations were made that the spin was intentional, as part of an effort by MWR to ensure that Martin Truex Jr. qualified for the Chase for the Sprint Cup. NASCAR president Mike Helton stated the following morning that scoring officials on the scene did not believe the spin was intentional, but that NASCAR was reviewing the incident. The following Monday evening, NASCAR docked all three MWR teams, including Bowyer, 50 driver/owner points. MWR was also fined $300,000.  Despite the large penalty, Bowyer retained enough points to remain in the Chase.  He had already clinched a spot in the Chase at the Irwin Tools Night Race.

2014

Bowyer did not participate in the Sprint Unlimited as he did not win a pole during the 2013 season. His season started on a wild note when Bowyer was involved in a last lap crash of race 2 in the Budweiser Duels, with Bowyer's car being sent airborne and performing a barrel roll before landing on its wheels.

At Darlington, Bowyer was the center of controversy when he got some contact with Kurt Busch. While racing Busch for a top-ten spot, Bowyer drove into the back of Kurt Busch who spun out and wrecked. Busch replied by waving his hands in frustration at Bowyer under yellow. In a post-race interview, Bowyer apologized, stating "You never want to wreck anybody. It was quite clear I got into the back of him and wrecked him."

Two weeks later at Richmond, Bowyer tried to move to the lead on lap 1 but tapped pole-sitter Kyle Larson which forced Larson to drive from 43rd for a recovery. Later his car caught fire on pit road during a pit-stop.

After an Atlanta engine blowup, Bowyer's hopes to make the Chase by consistency were dashed and the next week Bowyer missed the Chase by a slim 3 points. He would finish 19th in points

In the Texas Nationwide race, Bowyer replaced Elliott Sadler on lap seven due to a stomach illness, Bowyer qualified for Sadler for the race.

2015: Final Season At MWR

Bowyer started off the season with a top 10 at Daytona. Despite having a few top tens throughout the year, on August 19 it was announced that Bowyer & MWR will part ways after the season ends, with MWR not fielding full-time teams in 2016. On September 30, 2015, it was announced that Tony Stewart (Stewart-Haas Racing) would retire from the NASCAR Sprint Cup series after the 2016 season and negotiated a contract which will allow Bowyer to drive the No. 14 car in the 2017 season. On October 2, 2015, it was announced that Bowyer will move to HScott Motorsports for the 2016 season replacing Justin Allgaier before making his transition to Stewart-Haas Racing the following season. On December 15, 2015, a leaked photo on Twitter showed that Bowyer will bring over his No. 15 & 5-Hour-Energy sponsorship from Michael Waltrip Racing to HScott Motorsports for his lone season with them. Bowyer made the Chase due to having enough points to qualify, but his Chase was hit heavily by a 25 driver and owner points penalty, a $75,000 fine and the suspension of crew chief Billy Scott for 3 races. Bowyer appealed the penalties but they were upheld by the appeals panel. With the penalty, Bowyer didn't advance to the second round of the Chase.

In his last season with MWR, Bowyer was winless, and scored just 12 top 10s and finished 16th in the championship.

2016

Bowyer started the season on a low note finishing 33rd after a loose wheel at Daytona. Bowyer struggled at Atlanta with his car down a cylinder finishing 35th. Bowyer had some poor finishes, and including a 38th-place finish at Texas where he left the garage after the car was repairable. Bowyer later a first top ten finish this season coming at Bristol with an 8th-place finish. Two weeks later, Bowyer finished a season best 7th-place finish after avoiding massive crashes at Talladega. Coming back to Daytona, Bowyer would avoid crashes to finish 9th. Bowyer ended the season winless and no top 5s with only 3 top tens and finishing 27th in the point standings.

Bowyer returned to the Nationwide Series, now known as the Xfinity Series, at Chicagoland, driving the No. 88 for JR Motorsports.  He ended up starting the race in 7th and finishing the race in 6th.

2017: First Season At Stewart-Haas

With Tony Stewart's retirement, Bowyer moved from the No. 15 HSM Chevy to the No. 14 Stewart-Haas Racing Ford Fusion. Bowyer started the season with a 2nd-place finish on the 2nd Can-Am Duel. Bowyer got his first top ten at Las Vegas with a 10th-place finish. Bowyer had a significantly better race at Auto Club, finishing third and a 2nd-place at Bristol several races later. After no top fives 7 races later he finished second at Sonoma behind teammate Kevin Harvick giving Stewart-Haas Racing its 2nd ever 1-2 finish for the first time since 2011. Bowyer finished second again at the Coke Zero 400 at Daytona the following week. Deja vu happened as a mechanical issue in the Southern 500 at Darlington put Bowyer in a must-win situation at Richmond (just like in 2014) to make the Playoffs. He finished 24th after contact with Matt Kenseth as Kenseth avoided an ambulance at the entry of pit road while under caution and 18th in the final points standings.

2018

Bowyer got off to a strong start in 2018, posting Top 15 finishes in four of the first five events, including a third-place finish at the Atlanta race. On March 26, he broke a 190-race winless streak with a victory at the spring Martinsville race, which gave him his first Playoff run since 2015. Bowyer then scored his second win of the season at the rain-shortened June Michigan race. Despite bad finishes at Las Vegas and Dover, he has stayed consistent in the Playoffs, advancing to the Round of 8 before a crash at Phoenix eliminated him from the Playoffs. Bowyer finished the season 12th in points.

2019
At the conclusion of the 2019 Monster Energy NASCAR All-Star Race, Bowyer chopped Ryan Newman's nose which sent Bowyer into the wall during the cool-down lap. Following the race, Bowyer attacked Newman on pit road. Both drivers were called to the NASCAR hauler, but neither was penalized for the incident. During an autograph session at a Bass Pro Shops store on May 23, a fan brought a pair of boxing gloves for both drivers to sign. Despite a string of inconsistent finishes and no wins during the season, Bowyer managed to make the 2019 playoffs after finishing fifth at Indianapolis. On September 14, Bowyer won the pole at Las Vegas, his first pole since 2007. He finished fourth at the Charlotte Roval to advance to the Round of 12. Bowyer was eliminated in the Round of 12 after the Kansas race. He finished 9th in the final points standings despite not reaching victory lane as he did the season prior, his first top ten points finish since 2013. On December 4, 2019, Stewart-Haas Racing announced that Johnny Klausmeier would replace Mike Bugarewicz as the crew chief of the No. 14 team in 2020.

2020: Final Season
In March, Bowyer edged out Jimmie Johnson to win the pole for the Auto Club 400, the fourth of his career. He finished the race in 23rd place, one lap down. After accumulating seven top-ten finishes, including a runner-up finish at the spring Bristol race(his 82nd and final top-five), Bowyer qualified for the 2020 NASCAR Cup Series playoffs. On October 8, Bowyer revealed that he would be joining the Fox Sports broadcast booth for the 2021 season, stepping away from the driver's seat. Bowyer was eliminated from the playoffs after the round of 12. Bowyer scored his 226th and final top-ten at Martinsville and finished 14th at the season finale at Phoenix in his final race the following week later. He finished 12th in the points standings in his final season.

Clint Bowyer Racing
Bowyer started his own Dirt Late Model team, Clint Bowyer Racing in 2008. Well-established veteran Shannon Babb of Mowequa, IL was behind the wheel of Clint's Rocket Chassis, and had a very solid season. Babb left to form his own team at the end of 2008, due to wanting to run more of an "outlaw" type schedule, and wanting to race closer to home to be with his family. For the 2009 season, the 2005 World 100 Champion Dale McDowell (who ironically inherited the win via Babb being light at the scales) took over the seat, and the number was changed to Dale's signature No. 17M, Jared Landers also drives for the team in the No. 5 late model.

The team elected to run the Lucas Oil Late Model Dirt Series full-time in 2009, choosing to run Warrior Racecars, with help from Warrior's owner, Sanford Goddard. Winning two races and finishing fourth in the points standings, it was a decent season. Since then, the 17M has become a staple of the Lucas Oil Series, continuing on the 2010 tour. Clint Bowyer Racing also has fielded cars in Tony Stewart's Prelude to the Dream in 2008 (Bowyer, 2nd and Jimmie Johnson, 10th) and 2010 (Johnson won, Bowyer 2nd). Both years these were also Warrior Racecars.

Clint Bowyer Racing fielded a car for Clint in 2011 for the UNOH DIRTcar Nationals. A victory in a feature night race helped Clint secure the overall modified championship in the event. In 2014 Clint Bowyer Racing won its first Lucas Oil Dirt Late Model Championship with Don O'Neal driving the No. 5 Peak Performance car.

In 2016, after Clint Bowyer's lowest-ranking season with HScott Motorsports, Clint Bowyer and Clint Bowyer Racing filed a lawsuit against Harry Scott, Jr. charging him with breach-of-contract and fraud. The team charged that Bowyer brought some former MWR sponsors to the team and that HScott missed monthly payments for Bowyer's driving services in October and November 2016. Bowyer also alleged that the team was using money owed to him, to pay off their creditors. Upon filing the suit, Bowyer received a temporary court order against HScott Motorsports, ordering them to hold onto at least 2.2 million pending the lawsuit. The lawsuit was quickly settled out of court less than a week later, in a "mutual, amicable, confidential settlement."

Personal life
In April 2014, Bowyer married Lorra. Weeks after their marriage they announced that they were expecting their first child together, a boy. On October 1, 2014, their son Cash Aaron Bowyer was born. On June 15, 2016, it was announced that Bowyer and his wife were expecting their second child. On December 9, 2016, his wife Lorra gave birth to a healthy baby girl named Presley Elizabeth.

He is an avid fan of the Kansas City Royals of the MLB, the Kansas City Chiefs of the NFL, and the University of Kansas Jayhawks of the NCAA.

2022 car accident
Bowyer was absent from Fox's final Cup Series broadcast of the season at Sonoma on June 12. Larry McReynolds had replaced him in the booth for practice/qualifying and the race. Jordan Bianchi from The Athletic reported that Bowyer was "handling a personal matter" and would miss the race weekend. On June 16, WDAF-TV reported that on June 5, at 9 PM, Bowyer had hit a woman when driving home from the Cup Series race at Gateway earlier in the day. The incident took place on an exit ramp near Osage Beach, Missouri. The woman was pronounced dead and presumed to be under the influence. Bowyer's blood alcohol content was .000. An investigation revealed that the woman was walking along the exit ramp against the flow of traffic when she was struck by Bowyer's car. Furthermore, police found a bag of a crystalline substance among her personal items. A person questioned at a nearby campground said he and the woman used meth and alcohol earlier that day.

Charity work
On May 6, 2008, Clint Bowyer attended and hosted the first annual Clint Bowyer Charity Golf Event in his hometown of Emporia, Kansas. It raised $160,000 for the Emporia Community foundation to "make Emporia a better place".

While Bowyer was in Emporia for one of his golf tournaments for charity, he had the idea to raise money for and build a community center.  Bowyer dedicated the building on March 12, 2012.   Bowyer says he envisions the building can be used for anything for business meetings to weddings to concerts and was constructed with flexibility in mind.  The new Bowyer Community Building is located at the Lyon County fairgrounds, which is on Highway 50 in Emporia.

TV appearances
Bowyer made a guest appearance on an episode of A&E's Duck Dynasty in 2012 on an episode titled "Drag Me To Glory". Bowyer was featured in the episode using his customized camouflage limousine in a race with the shows star, Willie Robertson, who was using a similar limousine. In 2015, he co-hosted an episode of Diners, Drive-ins and Dives with Guy Fieri where they went around Charlotte to find the best food spots.

In June 2019, Bowyer was a color commentator for the Fox NASCAR broadcast of the Xfinity race at Pocono. Part of a Cup drivers-only coverage, he worked alongside Kevin Harvick and Joey Logano in the broadcast booth.

On October 8, 2020, Bowyer revealed that he would be joining the Fox Sports broadcast booth full time for the 2021 season, stepping away from the driver's seat.

Motorsports career results

NASCAR
(key) (Bold – Pole position awarded by qualifying time. Italics – Pole position earned by points standings or practice time. * – Most laps led.)

Cup Series

Daytona 500

Xfinity Series

Camping World Truck Series

West Series

 Season still in progress
 Ineligible for series points

ARCA Re/Max Series
(key) (Bold – Pole position awarded by qualifying time. Italics – Pole position earned by points standings or practice time. * – Most laps led.)

24 Hours of Daytona
(key)

References

External links

 
 

1979 births
Living people
People from Emporia, Kansas
Racing drivers from Kansas
NASCAR drivers
NASCAR Xfinity Series champions
ARCA Menards Series drivers
24 Hours of Daytona drivers
Rolex Sports Car Series drivers
Motorsport team owners
Emporia High School alumni
Richard Childress Racing drivers
Michael Waltrip Racing drivers
Stewart-Haas Racing drivers
AF Corse drivers
JR Motorsports drivers